Jack Debreczeni (born 6 June 1993) is a New Zealand rugby union player who currently plays as a fly half for the ACT Brumbies in the Super Rugby Pacific competition.

Background
Debreczeni was born in Auckland, New Zealand, Debreczeni is of Chilean, Cook Islands and Hungarian descent.

Debreczeni played an integral role and was a standout in Trinity Grammar's record breaking undefeated 2011 1st XV team, earning him selection in the Australian Schoolboys.

Style
Debreczeni is a tall, versatile fly-half standing at six-foot four he can play multiple roles including fullback. He has silky hands and deceptive pace despite his 192-centimetre, 102-kilogram frame, as well as his long distance kick which had garnered attention from the likes of AFL club Essendon.

Career

Melbourne Rebels
Debreczeni initially made a name for himself playing for West Harbour in the 2013 Shute Shield in New South Wales. Just one season at that level was enough to convince the Rebels of his worth and he was handed a place in the franchise's extended playing squad for the 2014 Super Rugby season. 

After his debut season in 2014, Debreczeni started and played fifteen of the sixteen regular season games in 2015 for the Rebels scoring two tries and making a total of thirty six points in his breakout season and helped the team finish tenth overall.
In 2016, Debreczeni played a big part in the Rebels twelfth-placed finished after the signing of Reece Hodge in August 2015. After only playing fourteen games during 2016, Debreczeni scored a total of 120 points finishing equal tenth overall with fellow Australian Bernard Foley.

In 2018, Debreczeni returned to the Rebels after a small stint in Japan, scoring his first try in round two of the 2018 season scoring a total of twenty points against Australian conference rival the Reds. It included two tries and five conversions, helping the team to score its most points in an individual game winning 45–19 at AAMI Park, Melbourne.

Honda Heat
In 2017, after only playing eight games for the Rebels many players including Debreczeni left the club after a very poor season and threat of the club being axed from the competition. It was announced in June that Debreczeni left for Japanese second-tier team Honda Heat in hopes of wearing the Wallabies jersey. He was replaced by Fijian fly-half Ben Volavola.

International
Debreczeni was an Australia Schoolboys representative in 2011.

Debreczeni was the traditional uncapped player in the Barbarians F.C. line up against Argentina on 1 December 2018. The international match was played at Twickenham Stadium, England.

Rugby statistics

References

External link

1993 births
Australian rugby union players
Australian people of Cook Island descent
Australian people of Chilean descent
Sportspeople of Chilean descent
Australian people of Hungarian descent
Rugby union fly-halves
Melbourne Rebels players
Melbourne Rising players
Rugby union players from Auckland
Rugby union players from Sydney
New Zealand emigrants to Australia
Living people
Northland rugby union players
Mie Honda Heat players
Chiefs (rugby union) players
Hino Red Dolphins players
Canterbury rugby union players
ACT Brumbies players